Olesoxime (TRO19622) is an experimental drug formerly under development by the now-defunct French company Trophos as a treatment for a range of neuromuscular disorders. It has a cholesterol-like structure and belongs to the cholesterol-oxime family of mitochondrial pore modulators.

Research
In preclinical studies, the compound displayed neuroprotective properties by promoting the function and survival of neurons and other cell types under disease-relevant stress conditions. It did so through interactions with two components of the mitochondrial permeability transition pore (mPTP), VDAC and TSPO. In preclinical studies on Huntington's disease, the disease-attenuating effects of olesoxime were attributed to modulating the activity of calcium-dependent proteases called calpains.

A 2009–2011 phase 3 clinical trial in amyotrophic lateral sclerosis did not demonstrate an increase in survival. A 2011–2013 trial in spinal muscular atrophy (SMA) indicated that the compound may prevent deterioration of muscle function. In 2015, the entire olesoxime programme was purchased by Hoffmann-La Roche for €120 million with a view to developing a treatment for SMA. However, in June 2018, faced with technical and regulatory challenges and competition from a potentially more effective drug nusinersen, Roche halted further development of olesoxime.

References

Further reading

External links 
 '

Drugs with unknown mechanisms of action
Cholestanes
Ketoximes
Hoffmann-La Roche brands
Spinal muscular atrophy
TSPO ligands